Kapasiwin is a summer village in Alberta, Canada. It is located in the eastern shore of Wabamun Lake, south of Wabamun Lake Provincial Park and the Yellowhead Highway. It was known as the Village of Wabamun Beach from 1913 to 1918.

History 
Kapasiwin was originally incorporated on October 25, 1913 as the Village of Wabamun Beach. It was renamed to the Village Municipality of Kepasiwin on August 28, 1918. Recognizing that the village acted like a summer village, the Province of Alberta officially incorporated it as the Summer Village of Kapasiwin on September 1, 1993.

Demographics 

In the 2016 Census of Population conducted by Statistics Canada, the Summer Village of Kapasiwin had a population of 10 living in 5 of its 41 total private dwellings, which represents no change from its 2011 population of 10.

See also 
List of communities in Alberta
List of summer villages in Alberta
List of resort villages in Saskatchewan

References

External links 

1913 establishments in Alberta
Edmonton Metropolitan Region
Summer villages in Alberta
Populated places established in 1913